Simois Colles is a region of colles (hills) in the northwest of Phaethontis quadrangle of Mars. It is located around 37.72° south latitude, and 176.59° west longitude.

References

External links 

Phaethontis quadrangle